Carrie Ann Baade (born February 18, 1974 in Louisiana) is an American painter whose work has been described by Curator of Contemporary Art Margaret Winslow as "autobiographical parables combin(ing) fragments of Renaissance and Baroque religious paintings, resulting in surreal landscapes inhabited by exotic flora, fauna, and figures." The context and the compositional building blocks of her work are fragments of historical masterpieces, which Baade reinterprets using her original feminist and autobiographical perspective. She currently lives in Tallahassee, Florida, where she is a professor in the Department of Art at Florida State University

Education and early life
Baade was born in New Orleans but spent the majority of her early years in a small town in central Colorado, where she graduated from high school. She attended The School of the Art Institute of Chicago, graduating with her BFA in 1997. During that period she spent a year in Italy studying the techniques of the old masters at the Florence Academy of Art. In 2003, she earned her MFA from the University of Delaware.

Style
"Carrie Ann Baade is a talented and highly imaginative artist whose work is irrevocably linked to the contemporary surreal movement." "Baade’s oils often contrast dense, extravagant contemporary and classical symbology with luminescent color, communicating themes of mortality, sexuality, personal transformation, and the darker side of human nature."

Exhibitions, grants, and awards
Baade has been nominated for the United States Artists Fellowship (2006) and the Joan Mitchell Grant (2012) and received the Florida Division of Cultural Affairs Individual Artist Fellowship and the Delaware Division of the Arts Fellowship for Established Artists.

Her paintings have been featured in various art exhibitions including: "Back and Forth: Thinking in Paint" at the John and Mable Ringling Museum of Art, "Solar Midnight" at the Museum of Contemporary Art Jacksonville (solo show,)"¡Orale! The Kings and Queens of Cool" at Harwood Museum of Art, "In Canon" at the Delaware Center for Contemporary Art, "Suggestivism" at CSUF Grand Central Art Center in Santa Monica, and "Another Roadside Attraction" at ISE Cultural Foundation in New York City. In 2007 she was among a group of three artists who became the first Americans ever to exhibit at the Ningbo Museum, one of the largest provincial museums in China, located outside of Shanghai. The director of the Ningbo Museum called them "the Mayflowers" for their contributions as cultural ambassadors.

Internationally, her paintings have been included in exhibitions in China, Austria, Germany, France, Poland, Italy, Spain, Mexico, and the Philippines; and featured in exhibitions at the Center for Culture in Warsaw, Museum La Ensenanza in San Cristóbal and the Museo de la Ciudad de Mexico, the Instituto de América de Santa Fe Museo in Granada Spain, and Espace Culturel Mompezat Société des Poètes Françaises in Paris.

In 2011, Baade curated "Cute and Creepy", a large group exhibit at the Museum of Fine Art at Florida State University of artists in the pop surrealism movement.

Publications

Books

 Baade, Carrie A, Ray Burggraf, Lilian Garcia-Roig, Mark Messersmith, and Judith Rushin.(2015) "Back and Forth: Thinking in Paint."  Print. ISBN No. 9781889282312 1889282316
 Stewart, Mary. (2014)  Launching the Imagination. McGraw-Hill Education, ISBN No. 0077773438, 9780077773434
 Baade, Carrie Ann & Hightower, Nancy E. (2011) Cute and Creepy. University of Washington Press. ISBN No. 978-1889282244
 Spoor, Nathan. (2011) Suggestivism: A Comprehensive Survey of Contemporary Artists. Gingko Press. ISBN No. 978-1584234470
 Ziegler, Tina. (2010) Hunt & Gather. Mark Batty Publisher. ISBN No. 978-0981960036
 Becket-Griffith, Jasmine. (2008) Gothic Art Now. HarperCollins Canada / Harper International. ISBN No. 978-0061626999.
 Kuntyj, Lynda. (2008) Visual Arts: A Resource for Units 2A-2B. Impact Publishing. ISBN No. 978-1921305245.
 Beinart, Jon. (2007) Metamorphosis: 50 Surrealists and Visionary Artists. Visionary Press. ISBN No. 978-0980323108

Magazines

 Staniec, Kevin. (2008) ISM: Untitled Love Project. Issue #15
 Weird Tales (Hugo Award Winner). Cover, Issue #358

References

External links 
 

1974 births
Living people
20th-century American painters
Painters from Florida
American women painters
School of the Art Institute of Chicago alumni
University of Delaware alumni
Painters from Louisiana
Florida State University faculty
20th-century American women artists
21st-century American women artists
Artists from New Orleans
American women academics